Tired may refer to:

Emotional or physical state
 Fatigue, a feeling of exhaustion
 Sleepy, having the need for sleep

Geography
 Tired Mountain, a mountain in Alaska

Music

EPs
 Tired (EP), a 2002 EP by Monkey Majik

Songs
 "Tired" (Alan Walker song), from 2017
 "Tired" (Stone Sour song), a song by Stone Sour from House of Gold & Bones - Part 1
 "Tired", a song by Adele on 19 from 2007
 "Tired", a song by LCD Soundsystem on LCD Soundsystem from 2005
 "Tired", a song by Rollins Band on Weight from 1994
 "Tired", a song originally performed by Tabitha's Secret, covered by Matchbox Twenty
 "Tired", a song by Vaughan Williams from Four Last Songs (Vaughan Williams)
 "Tired", a song by Willa Ford on Willa Was Here from 2001
 "Tired", a song by Kelly Price from 2011

See also
 
 
 Tire (disambiguation)